NoCopyrightSounds (NCS) is a British record label that releases royalty-free electronic dance music. Starting as a YouTube channel, it reached 1 million paid downloads in 2017.

History
NoCopyrightSounds was started as a YouTube channel in 2011 by an "avid gamer" named Billy Woodford. The label was described by Forbes as "a YouTube-first label that allows indie creators to use and even monetize its music freely as long as they give due credit back to the content owners."

In 2017, NoCopyrightSounds achieved a milestone of over a million sales of digital downloads, despite releasing music for free. The label manager Daniel J. Lee said "Similar to services with a freemium model, NCS provides both the option to enjoy music for free but at the same time also enables fans to support the music across paid services", asserting that the label releases music for free and also sells them. Woodford, about the milestone, stated, "I’m immensely proud to have reached 1 million paid downloads, and believe this shows the growth and strength NCS has built over the years." He also commented that "The demand for fresh original music from Creators is enormous and growing daily."

Artists

References

External links
Official website

British independent record labels
Electronic dance music record labels
Record labels established in 2011
Electronic music record labels
English electronic dance music record labels
Music-related YouTube channels
YouTube channels launched in 2011